Manyung is a rural locality split between the Gympie Region and the South Burnett Region, Queensland, Australia. In the  Manyung had a population of 63 people.

Geography
The Bunya Highway passes through from south to north-east.

History 
Opened on 14 September 1903, the fourth stage of the Nanango railway line took the line from Goomeri south to Wondai after passing through Manyung, Moondooner and Murgon.  Manyung railway station was originally called Yura.

The locality takes its name from the Manyung railway station name, assigned on 20 August 1910 by the Queensland Railways Department. Manyung is thought to be a Waka language word (possibly Bujiebara dialect) munum meaning either death adder or scrub fruit.

Manyung Provisional School opened on 28 October 1912. On 1 January 1916 it became Manyung State School. In 1921 it was relocated. It closed on 31 December 1963.

In the  Manyung had a population of 63 people.

References 

Gympie Region
South Burnett Region
Localities in Queensland